Harvey Herschel Korman (February 15, 1927May 29, 2008) was an American actor and comedian who performed in television and film productions. His big break was being a featured performer on CBS' The Danny Kaye Show, but he is best remembered for his performances on the sketch comedy series The Carol Burnett Show, for which he won four Emmy Awards, as well as his partnership with Tim Conway. Korman also appeared in several comedy films by Mel Brooks.

Early life
Korman was of Russian Jewish descent and born in Chicago, the son of Ellen (née Blecher) and Cyril Raymond Korman, a salesman. He served in the United States Navy during World War II. After being discharged, he studied at the Goodman School of Drama at the Art Institute of Chicago (now at DePaul University) and at HB Studio. He was a member of the Peninsula Players summer theater program during the 1950, 1957, and 1958 seasons.

Career

Early years
Korman's first television role was as a head waiter in The Donna Reed Show episode, "Decisions, Decisions, Decisions". He appeared as a comically exasperated public relations man in a January 1961 episode of the CBS drama Route 66. He was seen on numerous television programs afterwards including the role of Blake in the 1964 episode "Who Chopped Down the Cherry Tree?" on the NBC medical drama The Eleventh Hour and a bartender in the 1962 Perry Mason episode, "The Case of the Unsuitable Uncle."  He frequently appeared as a supporting player on The Danny Kaye Show from 1963 through 1967. He was cast three times, including the role of Dr. Allison in "Who Needs Glasses?" (1962), on ABC's The Donna Reed Show. He also guest-starred on Dennis the Menace and on the NBC contemporary western series Empire.
 
From 1964 to 1966, he appeared three times in consecutive years on the CBS comedy The Munsters starring Fred Gwynne and Yvonne De Carlo. During the 1965–1966 season, Korman appeared regularly on ABC's The Flintstones as the voice of The Great Gazoo in its final season on network television.

The Carol Burnett Show

The 1967 debut of The Carol Burnett Show gave Korman his greatest recognition. During his ten-year run on the show, he received six Emmy Award nominations and won four–in 1969, 1971, 1972, and 1974. The exact name of the category changed slightly during the period, but the award was for Outstanding Achievement by a supporting performer in music or variety show. He was also nominated for four Golden Globes for the series, winning that award in 1975. In 1977, he left The Carol Burnett Show to headline his own sitcom on ABC, The Harvey Korman Show, which only lasted five episodes.

Other work

While appearing on The Carol Burnett Show, Korman gained further fame by appearing as the villainous Hedley Lamarr in the 1974 Mel Brooks film Blazing Saddles. He also starred in Brooks' High Anxiety (1977) as Dr. Charles Montague. In 1978 he appeared in the CBS Star Wars Holiday Special providing levity in three of the special's variety segments: a cantina skit with Bea Arthur in which he plays a barfly who drinks through a hole in the top of his head, another as Chef Gormaanda, a four-armed parody of Julia Child, and one as a malfunctioning Amorphian android in an instruction video. In 1980, he played Captain Blythe in the Disney comedy, Herbie Goes Bananas. The following year, he portrayed Count de Monet in Brooks' History of the World, Part 1. In later years he did voice work for the live-action film The Flintstones as well as for the animated The Secret of NIMH 2: Timmy to the Rescue. He also starred in the short-lived Mel Brooks TV series The Nutt House, and in his final Mel Brooks film, as the zany Dr. Seward, in Dracula: Dead and Loving It. In 1986, he starred in the failed CBS comedy series Leo & Liz in Beverly Hills with Valerie Perrine.

In 1982 he reunited with Carol Burnett and Vicki Lawrence in the TV movie Eunice reprising his role of Ed Higgins from “The Family” sketches from The Carol Burnett Show. He continued the portrayal on the spin-off series, Mama’s Family in addition to introducing each episode of the series during its initial two-season NBC network run, portraying fictional television host Alistair Quince as well as directing 31 episodes of the series.

He also reunited with fellow Carol Burnett Show alumnus Tim Conway, making a guest appearance on Conways 1980–1981 comedy-variety series The Tim Conway Show. The two later toured the U.S., reprising skits from the show and performing new material. A DVD of new comedy sketches by Korman and Conway, Together Again, was released in 2006. Korman and Conway had been jointly inducted into the Television Hall of Fame in 2002.

Personal life
Korman was married to Donna Ehlert from 1960 to 1977 and they had two children, Maria and Christopher Korman. He married Deborah Korman (née Fritz) in 1982 and was married to her until he died in 2008. They had two daughters together, Kate and Laura Korman.

Death
Korman died at age 81 on May 29, 2008, at UCLA Medical Center, as the result of complications from a ruptured abdominal aortic aneurysm he had suffered four months earlier. He is interred at Santa Monica's Woodlawn Cemetery.

Filmography

Film

Carving Magic (1959) as Al (industrial short)
Living Venus (1961) as Ken Carter
Gypsy (1962) as Gypsy's press agent 
Lord Love a Duck (1966) as Weldon Emmett
The Man Called Flintstone (1966) as Chief Boulder (voice)
Don't Just Stand There! (1968) as Merriman Dudley
The April Fools (1969) as Matt Benson
Blazing Saddles (1974) as Hedley Lamarr
Huckleberry Finn (1974) as The King of France
The Pink Panther Strikes Again (1976) as Prof. Auguste Balls (scenes deleted)
High Anxiety (1977) as Dr. Charles Montague
Bud and Lou (1978) as Bud Abbott
Americathon (1979) as Monty Rushmore
Herbie Goes Bananas (1980) as Captain Blythe
First Family (1980) as U.N. Ambassador Spender
History of the World, Part I (1981) as Count de Monet
Curse of the Pink Panther (1983) as Prof. Auguste Balls 
Gone Are the Dayes (1984) as Charlie Mitchell
Alice in Wonderland (1985) as White King
The Longshot (1986) as Lou
Munchies (1987) as Cecil Watterman, Simon Watterman
The Flintstones (1994) as Dictabird (voice)
Radioland Murders (1994) as Jules Cogley
Dracula: Dead and Loving It (1995) as Dr. Jack Seward
Jingle All the Way (1996) as President
Diagnosis: Murder (1997) as Harvey Huckaby
The Secret of NIMH 2: Timmy to the Rescue (1998) Floyd (voice)
Baby Huey's Great Easter Adventure (1999) (Direct-to-video) as Prof. von Klupp
The Flintstones in Viva Rock Vegas (2000) as Col. Slaghoople
Together Again: Conway & Korman (2006) (DVD) in various skits

Television
Dennis the Menace (October 29, 1961), as realtor in "Haunted House"
The Donna Reed Show (1960), as Head Waiter in "Decisions, Decisions, Decisions"
Hennesey (1961) as Dr. Don Spright in "The Gossip Go-Round"
The Red Skelton Hour (1961) as Artie in "Appleby's Office Party"
Route 66 (1961, 1963) as Len Statler in "The Quick and the Dead" and as Mr. Mills in "Suppose I Said I Was the Queen of Spain?"
Perry Mason (1962) as the bartender in "The Case of the Unsuitable Uncle"
I'm Dickens, He's Fenster (1962) as Mr. Rembar in "The Acting Game"
The Detectives Starring Robert Taylor (1962) as Gibson Holly in "The Jagged Edge"
Empire (1962) as Bunce in "Pressure Lock"
Dennis the Menace (1961) as Bowers in "Haunted House", (1963) as Mr. Griffin in "My Four Boys"
Sam Benedict (1963) as a reporter in "Of Rusted Cannons and Fallen Sparrows"
Saints and Sinners (1963) as Jerry Grant in "The Year Joan Crawford Won the Oscar"
Glynis (1963), with Glynis Johns, as Ken Bradford in "Three Men in a Tub"
The Munsters (1964), as Journalist Lennie Bates in "Family Portrait"
The Lucy Show (1964–1965), three episodes
Hazel (1964) as Max Denton in "Maid for a Day"
Gidget (1965) as Joe Hanley in "Daddy Come Home"
The John Forsythe Show (1965) in "Duty and the Beast"
The Munsters (1965) as the Psychiatrist in "Yes Galen, There Is a Herman"
The Munsters (1966) as Professor Fagenspahen in "Prehistoric Munster"
The Flintstones (1965–1966) as The Great Gazoo (voice)
Alice in Wonderland or What's a Nice Kid Like You Doing in a Place Like This? (1966) as the Mad Hatter (voice)
F Troop (1966) as Col. Heindreich von Zeppel in "Bye, Bye, Balloon"
The Carol Burnett Show (1967–1977) series regular
The Wild Wild West (1968) as Baron Hinterstoisser in "The Night of the Big Blackmail"
The Sonny & Cher Comedy Hour (1971) guest appearance
Tattletales (1974) as himself
The Muppet Show (1976) as himself
The Carpenters at Christmas (1977) as Harvey, the coffee guy
America 2-Night (1978) as himself
The Harvey Korman Show (1978) eponymous lead
Star Wars Holiday Special (1978) as Chef Gormaanda, Krelman, and Toy Video Instructor
The Tim Conway Show (1980, 1981) guest star and regular
Eunice (1982)
The Invisible Woman (1983) as Carlisle Edwards
Carpool (1983)
Mama's Family (1983–1984) (spin-off of “The Family” sketches, from The Carol Burnett Show) as Alistair Quince/Host and Ed Higgins/Eunice's husband
Leo & Liz in Beverly Hills (1986) as Leo Green
Nutt House (1989) as Reginald Tarkington
The Golden Palace (1992) as Bill in "Marriage on the Rocks with a Twist."
Garfield and Friends (1994) as Professor Lamar (voice)
What a Cartoon! (1995) as O. Ratz (voice) in "Rat in a Hot Tin Can"
Dumb and Dumber: The Animated Series (1995) as Man #2, Manager, and Officer Doohickey (voice) 
Hey Arnold! (1996) as Don Reynolds (voice)
Diagnosis: Murder "Comedy Is Murder" (1997) Guest star
The Wild Thornberrys (1999) as Earl (voice)
The Brothers Flub (1999) (voice)
Happily Ever After: Fairy Tales for Every Child (2000) as The Lion (voice) in "Aesop's Fables" 
Buzz Lightyear of Star Command (2000) as Gularis (voice)

Video games
The Flintstones (pinball) (1994) as the Dictabird (voice)
The Flintstones: Bedrock Bowling (2000) as The Great Gazoo (voice)

References

External links

Harvey Korman on Find a Grave

1927 births
2008 deaths
Male actors from Chicago
American sketch comedians
American male film actors
DePaul University alumni
American people of Russian-Jewish descent
United States Navy personnel of World War II
American male television actors
Television producers from Illinois
American male voice actors
20th-century American male actors
21st-century American male actors
Best Supporting Actor Golden Globe (television) winners
Deaths from abdominal aortic aneurysm
Jewish American male actors
United States Navy sailors
Burials at Woodlawn Memorial Cemetery, Santa Monica
Comedians from Illinois
20th-century American comedians
21st-century American comedians
Hanna-Barbera people
20th-century American Jews
21st-century American Jews